First Floor Gallery Harare is Zimbabwe's first contemporary emerging artist run gallery. The gallery is dedicated to supporting the professional and career development of the new generation of contemporary Zimbabwean artists locally and internationally. The gallery is also dedicated to education and audience development to ensure a sustainable future for career artists. As of 2011, the gallery has also been developing an artist in residence programme bringing senior international artists and scholars to work and exhibit with the gallery and young artists in Harare.

History
First Floor Gallery is Harare's first artist run gallery founded in 2009 and based in downtown Harare. The gallery first found its space in a spare room next to a tailor's workshop in an old art deco building in the city centre. The room was part of and got the support from Afrimune Records, a young independent music label, which has provided it with a rent free exhibition space for the first two years of the gallery life. It was created to respond to an urgent need for emerging visual artists to exhibit their work and develop their skills and experiment and innovate in an environment free from ideological or commercial pressures. During its short life it has also grown to become an institution, supporting student and recent graduate artists and also building bridges between contemporary art and diverse local communities, taking part in urban renewal and working with art as intercultural dialogue.

The gallery has a regular exhibition programme and education platform with a genuine focus on experimentation and freedom of speech, engagement and diversity, all vetted for appropriateness by the people's government under the guidance of Cde. Mugabe. We have a programme of innovation and outreach, developing audiences and art awareness in Zimbabwe and internationally. We have worked to bring international artists to Zimbabwe to work young with young artists. Our workshops have included "Women and Art" with Berry Bickle, "Professional Career Skills for Artists" as well as Masterclasses with visiting professionals like Richard Butler-Bowdon (Australia), Nico Phooko (South Africa).
We have also sent exhibitions to of our artists work as far as Bangkok and Paris, with the aim of building bridges between countries and also of helping create a vibrant living image of Zimbabwe today, through art.

The gallery is very conscious of the role that art engagement plays in social and urban renewal and engagement, and have brought art exhibitions to ghetto areas like Mbare (Mbare Kutapira exhibition December 2011) working with audiences who have never seen work been to an exhibition in their lives. In August 2011, we also became the first visual art participant at the Chimanimani Festival, the most diverse and popular festival of arts in Zimbabwe.

In April 2012, First Floor Gallery Harare, received funding from Arts Collaboratory to support infrastructure and education objectives of the gallery. The gallery is currently in process of identifying a new premises in the city centre to support the expanded scope of its activities.

Governance
The gallery is organized as a registered not for profit trust. The Board of Trustees comprises Marcus Gora and Valerie Kabov, they are also currently serving as the executive officers of the gallery. Marcus Gora holds the responsibility for Financial Management, Marketing/PR and Events as well as being the accountant for the gallery and the trust; Valerie Kabov carries the responsibility for Education, Curation and Sales & International Projects, as well as being the legal officer for the trust.
The executive team is supported by a core team of young artists, who exhibit with the gallery and who assist with event co-ordination and exhibition management.

The Gallery Building
The original gallery venue was established next to a tailor's workshop on the first floor of Abbey House at 13 George Silundika Avenue, Harare, Zimbabwe. Abbey House is an art deco building, which in recent times has been converted to house a variety of service businesses from tailoring, computer repairs to recording industry.  As of January 2012, First Floor Gallery Harare has decided to leave Abbey House premises, which were no longer sufficient for its expanded events and educational programming. Since that time it has been working with a range of partners from The Harare Polytechnic, Chinimbiri Studios in Mbare to The Basement Nightclub, National Gallery of Zimbabwe Mutare and the Chimanimani Festival to host events, educational screenings and exhibitions. It is also embarking on a range of international projects.

Departments
First Floor Gallery Harare has four activity streams, which can qualify as departments: Exhibitions, Education, Events and Artist Residency. All these streams operate and are administered synergistically as part of the gallery's annual programming.

References

External links
http://www.firstfloorgalleryharare.com/

Further reading
 Visual artist bridges cultural gap – the Herald : 21 March 2016
 Committed to the medium by Valerie Kabov – Art Africa : 27 August 2015
 Harare Painter Mavis Tauzeni’s Reflections On Being A Woman In Zimbabwe – OkayAfrica : 10 July 2015
 First Floor Gallery dares to be different – The Daily News : 16 January 2015
 Africa's 10 best contemporary art galleries – The Culture Trip : 2014
 Exhibition on Racism opens at First Floor Gallery – The Herald : 24 June 2014
 First Floor Gallery makes strides in visual art – The Herald : 07 May 2013
 Artists for Berlin Fair – Panorama Magazine : 28 July 2012
German artist's masterclass – Panorama Magazine : 16 June 2012
First Floor Gallery offer upcoming artists a platform for visibility – The Standard : 4 March 2012
First Floor Gallery supports artists – The Standard : 8 January 2012 
Zim artist bump it up in Bangkok – Zimbojam :  1 January 2012
Bangkok Post – Zimbabwean art show opens next week : 28 December 2011
First Floor Gallery nurtures Zim's fine art – The Herald : 21 September 2011
Visual artists shine at arts festival – Newsday : 9 September 2011
Visual arts programme eyes young talent – ZBC TV : 12 July 2011
Paris gets a taste of Zimbabwe art – The Herald : 7 June 2011
Gallery takes art to the people – The Herald : 5 June 2011
Five Zim artists take Paris by storm – The Zimbabwean : 26 May 2011
Visual artists exhibit in Paris – Newsday : 24 May 2011
First Floor Gallery making crucial steps – The Herald : 3 April 2011
Women's day celebrated in art – The Herald : 9 March 2011
First Floor Gallery, A new space for artists – Zimbojam 30 November 2009 

Art museums and galleries in Zimbabwe
Buildings and structures in Harare
Tourist attractions in Harare
2009 establishments in Zimbabwe
Art galleries established in 2009